KDDS-FM (99.3 FM) is a radio station broadcasting a Regional Mexican format. Licensed to Elma, Washington, United States, it serves the Seattle area.  Bustos Media used to own the station. In September 2010, Bustos transferred most of its licenses to Adelante Media Group as part of a settlement with its lenders.

Formerly, 99.3 was KAYO, licensed to Aberdeen, Washington, and played a country music format. On June 8, 2005, the station switched to their current call letters and format.

Effective December 10, 2014, Bustos Media reacquired KDDS-FM, along with eight other stations and a translator, from Adelante Media for $6 million.

References

External links

FCC History Cards for KDDS

Regional Mexican radio stations in the United States
DDS-FM
Radio stations established in 1981